Zamin-e Anjir (also Romanized as Zamīn-e Anjīr and Zamīn Anjīr) is a village in Javaran Rural District, Hanza District, Rabor County, Kerman Province, Iran. At the 2006 census, its population was 110, in 26 families.

References 

Populated places in Rabor County